The Last Spike Memorial is a monument in the Ruapehu District of New Zealand. It marks the location where the "last spike" was driven in 1908 for the completion of the North Island Main Trunk line.

Location

Description
A concrete obelisk was erected in early 1909. The monument marks the location where the Prime Minister, Sir Joseph Ward, conducted a last spike ceremony on 6 November 1908. It is marked by road signs on State Highway 4 and a small carpark.

Recognition

As part of its "Engineering to 1990" project, the Institution of Professional Engineers New Zealand (IPENZ; now Engineering New Zealand Te Ao Rangahau) added the central section of the North Island Main Trunk line to its engineering heritage register. In 1997, IPENZ put two new brass inscription plates on the monument. On 10 December 2004, the monument was registered by the New Zealand Historic Places Trust (now Heritage New Zealand) as a Category II structure, with the registration number 7575.

See also
 Golden spike (United States)
 Last spike (Canadian Pacific Railway)

References

Monuments and memorials in New Zealand
Obelisks
Heritage New Zealand Category 2 historic places in Manawatū-Whanganui
Ruapehu District
Rail transport in Manawatū-Whanganui
History of transport in New Zealand